Walter Tebogo Letsie is a South African politician. In 2019 he became a Member of Parliament (MP) for the African National Congress.

Since becoming an MP, he has served on the  Portfolio Committee on Basic Education and the Portfolio Committee on Higher Education, Science and Technology.

References

External links

Letsie, Walter Tebogo at African National Congress Parliamentary Caucus

Living people
Year of birth missing (living people)
Place of birth missing (living people)
People from Gauteng
African National Congress politicians
Members of the National Assembly of South Africa